The 65th running of the Tour of Flanders cycling classic was held on Sunday, 5 April 1981. Dutch rider Hennie Kuiper claimed a solo victory ahead of his fellow Dutchmen Frits Pirard and Jan Raas. 45 of 184 riders finished.

Route
The race started in Sint Niklaas and finished in Meerbeke (Ninove) – covering 267 km. There were 11 categorized climbs:

Results

References

External links
 Video of the 1981 Tour of Flanders  on Sporza (in Dutch)

Tour of Flanders
Tour of Flanders
Tour of Flanders
Tour of Flanders
Flanders, Tour of